"She Moved Through the Fair", also called "She Moves Through the Fair", is a traditional Irish folk song, which exists in a number of versions and has been recorded many times. The narrator sees his lover move away from him through the fair, after telling him that since her family will approve, "it will not be long, love, till our wedding day". She returns as a ghost at night, and repeats the words "it will not be long, love, till our wedding day", intimating her own tragic death and the couple's potential reunion in the afterlife.

Origins of the melody
The melody is in Mixolydian mode. John Loesberg speculates: "From its strange, almost Eastern sounding melody, it appears to be an air of some antiquity," but he does not define its age any more precisely. It has been found both in Ireland and in Scotland, but scraps of the song were first collected in County Donegal by the Longford poet Padraic Colum and the musicologist Herbert Hughes.

Origins and publishing of the lyrics
The lyrics were first published in Hughes' Irish Country Songs, published by Boosey & Hawkes in 1909.

In a letter published in The Irish Times in 1970, Colum stated that he was the author of all but the final verse. He also described how Herbert Hughes collected the tune and then he, Colum, had kept the last verse of a traditional song and written a couple of verses to fit the music.

One verse was not included in the first publication: Colum soon realised that he had not put in the poem the fact that the woman had died before the marriage, and so he wrote the verse that begins: "The people were saying, that no two were e'er wed, but one had a sorrow that never was said ..." and sent it on to Hughes, too late for publication in that particular collection. This extra verse was published in other collections, along with the other three verses. The lyrics were also published in Colum's collection Wild Earth: And Other Poems (1916), though the traditional origin of the final verse is not mentioned there.

In the course of the same Irish Times correspondence, however, another music collector, Proinsias Ó Conluain, said he had recorded a song called "She Went Through the Fair", with words the same as the other three verses of "She Moved Through the Fair", sung by an old man who told him that "the song was a very old one" and that he had learned it as a young man from a basket-weaver in Glenavy.

Alternative version 

The traditional singer Paddy Tunney relates how Colum wrote the song after returning from a literary gathering in Donegal with Herbert Hughes and others. Tunney suggests, however, that it would be more accurate to say that Colum simply added additional lyrics, not the melody, to an original traditional song that by then had generated many variations throughout Ireland.

Tunney himself collected one version from an Irish singer called Barney McGarvey. This version was called "I Once Had a True Love". The opening four lines are reminiscent of "She Moved Through the Fair" and the second four lines are unmistakably similar.

The words to the first verse are:

I once had a sweet-heart, I loved her so well
I loved her far better than my tongue could tell
Her parents they slight me for my want of gear
So adieu to you Molly, since you are not here
I dreamed last night that my true love came in
So softly she came that her feet made no din
She stepped up to me and this she did say
It will not be long, love, till our wedding day

The remaining two verses are quite different. Tunney also points to a version of the song that he learned from his mother, who called it "My Young Love Said to Me". The first verse is virtually the same as Colum's, but the remaining three verses are quite different:

My young love said to me, my mother won't mind
And my father won't slight you for your lack of kine
And she went away from me and this she did say:
It will not be long now till our wedding day.
She went away from me and she moved through the fair
Where hand-slapping dealers' loud shouts rent the air
The sunlight around her did sparkle and play
Saying it will not be long now till our wedding day.

When dew falls on meadow and moths fill the night
When glow of the greesagh on hearth throws half-light
I'll slip from the casement and we'll run away
And it will not be long love till our wedding day
According to promise at midnight he rose
But all that he found was the downfolded clothes
The sheets they lay empty 'twas plain for to see
And out of the window with another went she.

Variants and related songs
One variant of the song is called "Our Wedding Day". A related song, "Out of the Window", was collected by Sam Henry from Eddie Butcher of Magilligan in Northern Ireland in around 1930 and published in 1979. Yet another song, "I Once Had a True Love", also appears to be related, as it shares some lyrics with "She Moved Through the Fair". 

"I Was In Chains", written by Gavin Sutherland and recorded by The Sutherland Brothers on their album The Sutherland Brothers Band (1972), has a similar tune but completely different words. Paul Young covered this song on his album The Secret of Association (1985).

The 1989 song "Belfast Child" by Simple Minds incorporates the melody of "She Moved Through the Fair".

In the 1990s the tune was used in the winning entry in the Comórtas na nAmhrán Nuachumtha ("Competition for newly composed songs") in Ráth Cairn. The subject of the song, Bailéad an Phíolóta ("The Ballad of the Pilot"), was a plane crash that took place in 1989 on an unlit runway on Árainn Mhór.

Other name variants include "She Moved Thru' The Fair", "She Moved Thro' The Fair", and "He Moved Through The Fair"

Performances and recordings

Scottish tenor Sydney MacEwan recorded the song in 1936 and Irish tenor John McCormack recorded it in 1941. 
 
In 1952, folklorist Peter Kennedy recorded the McPeake Family singing a version based on that of Margaret Barry entitled "Our Wedding Day." It featured a bagpipe accompaniment by Francis McPeake, II. The traditional singer Paddy Tunney learned "She Moved Through the Fair" in County Fermanagh and recorded it in 1965. Other singers who sang it in the 1950s and the 1960s included Patrick Galvin, Dominic Behan and Anne Briggs. It was popular among members of the Traveller community in Ireland at that time.

Fairport Convention recorded the song in 1968, adapting the style of the song from the Traveller Margaret Barry, though she herself had learned it from the John McCormack vinyl recording. Former Fairport Convention guitarist and songwriter Richard Thompson regularly includes the song in concert performances. Also of note are the recordings of the song by Alan Stivell in 1973. Art Garfunkel (formerly of Simon & Garfunkel) recorded a particularly lush version on his album Watermark (1977).

Versions of the song recorded by Sinéad O'Connor (as used on the soundtrack of the film Michael Collins), Trees and Nana Mouskouri change the gender of the pronouns, so the song became "He Moved Through the Fair". O'Connor's and Trees' versions keep the original title even so, but Mouskouri changes it. In a 2015 interview, O'Connor expressed regret for having changed the gender. An alternative version of the lyrics is also used in Mary Black's version of the song.

In June 2016, the BBC TV series The Living and the Dead premiered a version of the song sung by Elizabeth Fraser in collaboration with The Insects.

Other notable versions:

References

External links 
 Sissel & The Chieftains Live recording of "Love, Will You Marry Me?" and "She Moved Through The Fair" (2001)
 Traditional Ballad Index, California State University: sources and notes about the song
 The lyrics and a MIDI version of the song
 Information/speculation about the history, origins and variations of the song
 Lyrics and chords
 Sheet music
 Full poem and song

1989 singles
Irish folk songs
UK Singles Chart number-one singles
Year of song unknown